Medea is a female given name of either Persian or Greek Origin. From the Greek Μήδεια Mēdeia, possibly meaning either to ponder or cunning. In Greek mythology Medea was a sorceress from Colchis who helped Jason gain the Golden Fleece. They were married, but eventually Jason left her for another woman. For revenge Medea slew Jason's new lover and also had her own children by Jason killed. Georgian popular tradition attributes the origins of the term Medicine to Medea's name. It may also refer to Media, an ancient kingdom in northwestern Iran, inhabited by the Medes, identified as the Ancestors of modern Kurds.

Name Days 
Czech: 4 September
Hungarian: 4 September

Famous bearers 
Amadea Palaiologina of Montferrat (1418–1440), queen consort of Cyprus
Medea Chakhava (1921-2009), Georgian theater and film actress.
Medea Dvorská, Czech girl living in Parsifal Imanuel's denomination in Belgium.
Medea, is a princess from Colchis (Western Georgia) in Greek mythology
Medea Amiranashvili, Georgian opera singer and film actress.
Medea Japaridze, Georgian theater and film actress.
Medea Benjamin, United States of America world famous peace activist (See Wikipedia)

Greek feminine given names
English feminine given names
Hungarian feminine given names